In classical antiquity, the seven classical planets or seven luminaries are the seven moving astronomical objects in the sky visible to the naked eye: the Moon, Mercury, Venus, the Sun, Mars, Jupiter, and Saturn. The word planet comes from  two related Greek words, πλάνης planēs (whence πλάνητες ἀστέρες planētes asteres "wandering stars, planets") and πλανήτης planētēs, both with the original meaning of "wanderer", expressing the fact that these objects move across the celestial sphere relative to the fixed stars. Greek astronomers such as Geminus and Ptolemy often divided the seven planets into the Sun, the Moon, and the five planets.

The term planet in modern terminology is only applied to natural satellites directly orbiting the Sun (or other stars), so that only five of the seven classical planets are planets in the modern sense. The same seven planets, along with the ascending and descending lunar node, are mentioned in Vedic astrology as the nine Navagraha.

Babylonian astronomy

The Babylonians recognized seven planets. A bilingual list in the British Museum records the seven Babylonian planets in the following order:

In Mandaeism, the names of the Seven Planets are derived from the seven Babylonian planets. Similarly, in Syriac, all the planet names derive from the Babylonian planets in the Akkadian language.

Symbols

The astrological symbols for the classical planets appear in the medieval Byzantine codices in which many ancient horoscopes were preserved. In the original papyri of these Greek horoscopes, there are found a circle with one ray for the Sun and a crescent for the Moon.
The written symbols for Mercury, Venus, Jupiter, and Saturn have been traced to forms found in late Greek papyri. The symbols for Jupiter and Saturn are identified as monograms of the initial letters of the corresponding Greek names, and the symbol for Mercury is a stylized caduceus. 

A. S. D. Maunder finds antecedents of the planetary symbols in earlier sources, used to represent the gods associated with the classical planets. Bianchini's planisphere, produced in the 2nd century, shows Greek personifications of planetary gods charged with early versions of the planetary symbols: Mercury has a caduceus; Venus has, attached to her necklace, a cord connected to another necklace; Mars, a spear; Jupiter, a staff; Saturn, a scythe; the Sun, a circlet with rays radiating from it; and the Moon, a headdress with a crescent attached.
A diagram in Johannes Kamateros' 12th century Compendium of Astrology shows the Sun represented by the circle with a ray, Jupiter by the letter zeta (the initial of Zeus, Jupiter's counterpart in Greek mythology), Mars by a shield crossed by a spear, and the remaining classical planets by symbols resembling the modern ones, without the cross-mark seen in modern versions of the symbols. The modern Sun symbol, pictured as a circle with a dot (☉), first appeared in the Renaissance.

Planetary hours

The Ptolemaic system used in Greek astronomy placed the planets by order of proximity to Earth in the then-current geocentric model, closest to furthest, as the Moon, Mercury, Venus, Sun, Mars, Jupiter, and Saturn. In addition the day was divided into seven-hour intervals, each ruled by one of the planets, although the order was staggered (see below).

The first hour of each day was named after the ruling planet, giving rise to the names and order of the Roman seven-day week. Modern Latin-based cultures, in general, directly inherited the days of the week from the Romans and they were named after the classical planets; for example, in Spanish Miércoles is Mercury, and in French mardi is Mars-day.

The modern English days of the week were mostly inherited from gods of the old Germanic Norse culture – Wednesday is Wōden’s-day (Wōden or Wettin eqv. Mercury), Thursday is Thor’s-day (Thor eqv. Jupiter), Friday is Frige-day (Frige eqv. Venus).  Equivalence here is by the gods' roles; for instance, Venus and Frige were both goddesses of love. It can be correlated that the Norse gods were attributed to each Roman planet and its god, probably due to Roman influence rather than coincidentally by the naming of the planets.  A vestige of the Roman convention remains in the English name Saturday.

Alchemy

In alchemy, each classical planet (Moon, Mercury, Venus, Sun, Mars, Jupiter, and Saturn) was associated with one of the seven metals known to the classical world (silver, mercury/quicksilver, copper, gold, iron, tin and lead respectively).  As a result, the alchemical glyphs for the metal and associated planet coincide.  Alchemists believed the other elemental metals were variants of these seven (e.g. zinc was known as "Indian tin" or "mock silver").

Alchemy in the Western World and other locations where it was widely practiced was (and in many cases still is) allied and intertwined with traditional Babylonian-Greek style astrology; in numerous ways they were built to complement each other in the search for hidden knowledge (knowledge that is not common i.e. the occult). Astrology has used the concept of classical elements from antiquity up until the present day today. Most modern astrologers use the four classical elements extensively, and indeed they are still viewed as a critical part of interpreting the astrological chart.

Traditionally, each of the seven "planets" in the Solar System as known to the ancients was associated with, held dominion over, and "ruled" a certain metal (see also astrology and the classical elements).

The list of rulership is as follows:
 The Sun rules Gold
 The Moon, Silver
 Mercury, Quicksilver/Mercury
 Venus, Copper
 Mars, Iron
 Jupiter, Tin
 Saturn, Lead

Some alchemists (e.g. Paracelsus) adopted the Hermetic Qabalah assignment between the vital organs and the planets as follows:

Contemporary astrology

Western astrology

Indian astrology

Indian astronomy and astrology (Jyotiṣa) recognises seven visible planets (including the Sun and Moon) and two additional invisible planets(tamo'graha).

Chinese astronomy

The cycles of the Chinese calendar are linked to the orbit of Jupiter, there being 12 sacred beasts in the Chinese dodecannualar geomantic and astrological cycle, and 12 years in the orbit of Jupiter.

Naked-eye planets

Mercury and Venus are visible only in twilight hours because their orbits are interior to that of Earth. Venus is the third-brightest object in the sky and the most prominent planet. Mercury is more difficult to see due to its proximity to the Sun. Lengthy twilight and an extremely low angle at maximum elongations make optical filters necessary to see Mercury from extreme polar locations. Mars is at its brightest when it is in opposition, which occurs approximately every twenty-five months. Jupiter and Saturn are the largest of the five planets, but are farther from the Sun, and therefore receive less sunlight. Nonetheless, Jupiter is often the next brightest object in the sky after Venus. Saturn's luminosity is often enhanced by its rings, which reflect light to varying degrees, depending on their inclination to the ecliptic; however, the rings themselves are not visible to the naked eye from the Earth. Uranus and sometimes the asteroid Vesta are in principle visible to the naked eye on very clear nights, but, unlike the true naked-eye planets, are less luminous than thousands of stars, and as such, do not stand out enough for their existence to be noticed without the aid of a telescope.

Notes

See also
 Antikythera mechanism
 Aspects of Venus
 Astra Planeta
 Behenian fixed star
 Celestial spheres
 Definition of planet
 List of Mesopotamian deities#Major deities
 List of former planets
 Wufang Shangdi

References

External links
The Naked Eye Planets and how to identify them
Wandering Stars: Movements and Visibility Cycles of the Naked Eye Planets
Chronology of Discoveries in the Solar System

Ancient astronomy
Planets of the Solar System